Hylaea is a genus of moths in the family Geometridae erected by Jacob Hübner in 1822.

Species
Species include:
 Hylaea fasciaria (Linnaeus, 1758) – barred red
 Hylaea pinicolaria (Bellier, 1861)

References

Campaeini
Taxa named by Jacob Hübner